Jitendra Pal Singh Billu (17 June 1969) is an Indian politician and a member of BJP. In 2017, he was elected as the member of the Uttar Pradesh Legislative Assembly from Siwalkhas.

Constituency
He won the Siwalkhas on an BJP ticket, Pal Singh Billu beat the member of the Uttar Pradesh Legislative Assembly Ghulam Mohammad of the SP by over 11421 votes.

References

Living people
Uttar Pradesh MLAs 2017–2022
Janata Party politicians
1969 births
Bharatiya Janata Party politicians from Uttar Pradesh